Zilla may refer to:

Arts and entertainment
 Vittore Zanetti Zilla (1864–1946), Italian painter
 Zilla Mays (1931–1995), American R&B, gospel singer and pioneering DJ
 Zilla (Godzilla), a fictional film monster
 Zilla (band), a trance band started in 2004
 Zilla (rapper), formerly VZilla, stage name of underground rapper and producer Victor Gurrola Jr.
 Willy Zilla, protagonist of My Dad the Rock Star, a Canadian/French animated TV series
 Zilla, the major antagonist in the video game Shadow Warrior

Plants and animals
 Zilla (plant), a plant genus in the family Brassicaceae
 Zilla (spider), an animal genus in the family Araneidae

Other uses
 Zillah (country subdivision) or Zilla, a country subdivision in Bangladesh, India and Pakistan
 -zilla, a suffix derived from the fictional monster Godzilla
 Zilla motor controller, a type of motor controller

See also

 Zillah (disambiguation)